The Acid Tests were a series of parties held by author Ken Kesey primarily in the San Francisco Bay Area during the mid-1960s, centered on the use of and advocacy for the psychedelic drug LSD, commonly known as "acid".  LSD was not made illegal in California until October 6, 1966.

History 
The name "Acid Test" was coined by Kesey, after the term "acid test" used by gold miners in the 1850s. He began throwing parties at his farm at La Honda, California. The Merry Pranksters were central to organizing the Acid Tests, including Pranksters such as Lee Quarnstrom and Neal Cassady. Other people, such as LSD chemists Owsley Stanley and Tim Scully, were involved as well.

Kesey took the parties to public places, and advertised with posters that read, "Can you pass the acid test?", and the name was later popularized in Tom Wolfe's 1968 book The Electric Kool-Aid Acid Test. Musical performances by the Grateful Dead were commonplace, along with black lights, strobe lights, and fluorescent paint. The Acid Tests are notable for their influence on the LSD-based counterculture of the San Francisco area and subsequent transition from the beat generation to the hippie movement. The Jefferson Airplane song "A Song for All Seasons" (from Volunteers) mentions the Acid Tests.

Timeline
1965
 27 November; Soquel, California—The first Acid Test was a party at Ken Babbs' house on 27 November 1965, although Ken Babbs recalls it as Halloween night. A flyer of the Warlocks, however, (one week before the band became known as the Grateful Dead) shows they played at Soquel as the Warlocks on November 27. There is no evidence this flyer is genuine, and several witnesses confirm that the Warlocks / Grateful Dead did not play at Soquel, but that they did casually play some Prankster instruments. In his book, Phil Lesh confirms that he attended: 'We were at the first Test not to play, but just to feel it out, and we hadn't brought any instruments or gear'   Most likely Phil Lesh, Bob Weir and Jerry Garcia, members of the future Grateful Dead did attend this party.
 4 December; San Jose, California (first performance by the Grateful Dead, until then known as the Warlocks)
 11 December; Muir Beach, California
 18 December, Palo Alto, California

1966
 8 January; San Francisco, California (Fillmore)
 15 January; Portland, Oregon
 21–23 January; San Francisco (Trips Festival at Longshoreman's Hall)
 29 January; San Francisco, California (Sound City Studios)
 5 February; Los Angeles, California - Sepulveda Unitarian Universalist Society
 12 February; Watts, Los Angeles – Youth Opportunities Center
 25 February; Los Angeles, California (Hollywood) – Cinema Theatre
 12 March; Los Angeles, California (Danish Center)
 19 March;  Los Angeles, California (Pico) Carthay Studios
 25 March; Los Angeles, California (Sunset Strip) – Troupers Club
 30 September – 2 October; San Francisco State College – Whatever It Is Festival – three days
 31 October; San Francisco, California — Acid Test Graduation (Bill Graham cancelled Winterland Ballroom event, Grateful Dead played at the California Hall (San Francisco, California) that night, and the event was held at a SoMa warehouse.)

1967
 16 March; Houston, Texas (Brown College, Rice University) (despite the "graduation" concept of the final West Coast Acid Test, the actual final Acid Test of The Merry Pranksters was organized in Texas by Kesey's friend Larry McMurtry)

1968
 24 October; Congress passes the Staggers–Dodd Bill, criminalizing the recreational use of LSD-25

Trips Festival

Ramon Sender co-produced the Trips Festival with Ken Kesey and Stewart Brand. It was a three-day event that, in conjunction with The Merry Pranksters, brought together the nascent hippie movement. The Trips Festival was held at the Longshoreman's Hall in San Francisco in January 1966. Counterculture sound engineer Ken Babbs is mostly credited for the sound systems he created for the Trips Festival.  Prior to Babbs' creation, it was discovered that particular music usually sounded distorted when cranked to high levels because of the cement floor on the San Francisco Longshoreman's Union Hall (where the Trips Festival was taking place).  Babbs being a sound engineer resolved the problem.  He made sound amplifiers that would not create distorted sounds when turned up to high sound levels.

Organized by Stewart Brand, Ken Kesey, Owsley Stanley, Zach Stewart and others, ten thousand people attended this sold-out event, with a thousand more turned away each night. On Saturday January 22, the Grateful Dead and Big Brother and the Holding Company came on stage, and 6,000 people arrived to drink punch spiked with LSD and to witness one of the first fully developed light shows of the era.

Big Brother and the Holding Company was formed at the Trips Festival. In the audience was painter and jazz drummer David Getz, who soon joined the band.

See also
 Electric Kool Aid Acid Test
 Grateful Dead
 Ken Kesey
 Lee Quarnstrom
 List of historic rock festivals
 Merry Pranksters
 Owsley Stanley

References

General sources
 
 

Culture in the San Francisco Bay Area
Lysergic acid diethylamide
Psychedelia
Counterculture festivals
Counterculture of the 1960s
California culture
1965 in California
1966 in California
1960s in San Francisco